Emergo is a Latin word meaning "I emerge".

It appears in or can refer to:

Luctor et emergo - the motto of the Dutch province of Zeeland
 the board game Emergo
 Apartment 143, a 2012 film originally named Emergo